Emma Frances Heming Willis ( Heming; born June 18, 1978) is a British and American model and entrepreneur.

Early life
Born in Malta to a British father and an Indo-Guyanese mother, Willis was raised in north London and California.

Career
In the early 1990s, Heming was first discovered on the UK morning television show, The Big Breakfast's "The British Elle Supermodel" competition, with Lorraine Ashton model agency, which she won. 

She was a spokesmodel for the Canadian lingerie retailer La Senza and has appeared in advertisements around the world, including for Dior Bronze, Escada, Gap, Garnier, Intimissimi, John Frieda, Palmers, and Redken. 

She has appeared on the covers of Elle (Spain, France and Turkey), Elle Décor, Glamour, Shape, Town and Country, and W. In 2005, Maxim magazine placed her at number 86 in its "Top 100" list of the world’s most beautiful women.

She has also walked the runway for fashion shows including Herve Leger, John Galliano, Paco Rabanne, Christian Dior, Chanel, Maska, Thierry Mugler, Valentino, Emanuel Ungaro, Ralph Lauren, and the Victoria's Secret Fashion Show.

Personal life

On March 21, 2009, Heming married actor Bruce Willis in the Turks and Caicos Islands. The ceremony was not legally binding and the couple were married again in a civil ceremony in Beverly Hills, six days later. They have two daughters together, Mabel Ray (2012) and Evelyn Penn (2014), and Heming is also a stepmother to Bruce Willis' three elder daughters from his first marriage to actress Demi Moore.

Filmography

References

External links
 
 Emma Heming Willis official Website
 

1978 births
American people of Guyanese descent
American people of Indian descent
English people of Indian descent
English people of Indo-Guyanese descent
British female models
English emigrants to the United States
English people of Guyanese descent
Living people
The Lions (agency) models